Gdańsk Port Północny Lighthouse (Gdańsk North Port Lighthouse) is a lighthouse in Gdańsk, located on the Polish coast of the Baltic Sea, by the Bay of Gdańsk. It is the youngest lighthouse in Poland; located between the lighthouse in Hel, and the lighthouse in Krynica Morska.

The lighthouse houses the admiralty of the Port of Gdańsk and is not open for the public. The lighthouse is the only lighthouse in Poland to have a lift to get to the top command deck. The lighthouse was built in 1984.

Technical data 
 Light characteristic
 Light: 0.5 s.
 Darkness: 1.5 s.
 Light: 0.5 s.
 Darkness: 1.5 s.
 Light: 0.5 s.
 Darkness: 4.5 s.
 Period: 9 s.

See also 

 List of lighthouses in Poland

References

External links 
 Urząd Morski w Słupsku  

Lighthouses completed in 1984
Resort architecture in Pomerania
Lighthouses in Poland
Tourist attractions in Pomeranian Voivodeship